Hayati Çitaklar (born 18 September 1986) is a Turkish playwright, director, novelist, actor and poet. He is also the editor of some literature magazines.

Background
Hayati Çitaklar was born in Tekirdağ in 1986. He is of partial Albanian descent. He got training in acting at Nâzım Hikmet Foundation and creative writing at Uğur Mumcu Investigative Journalism Foundation. He went on to study philosophy at the Bilkent University then he changed the university and graduated from the College of Social Sciences and Humanities with three different major Continental Philosophy, Comparative Literature and Gender Studies at the Koç University in 2011 with honour. 2008 to 2011, he is the special student of Istanbul University State Conservatory Theatre Department. From 2000, he publishes poems, short stories, articles and book and film reviews in literature journals, magazines and newspapers. In 2010, he left acting and directing to become a full-time writer. In 2010, he worked with famous Turkish actress and theatre professor Yıldız Kenter and began his career as a playwright. His play Alyosa/ Story of Aliye Berger was published by Imge Publishing. His plays and performance texts were performed by different theatres in Turkey.

Awards
 2008 S. Avni Ölmez Poetry Competition Committee: Special Award
 2008 Eskisehir Culture, Art and Literature Association: Short Story Award
 2008 Kocaeli University 12th Youth Poetry Competition: Poetry Award
 2008 Yahya Kemal Beyatlı Poetry Competition Young Poet Award
 2009 Salom Newspaper Gila Kohen Story Award
 2009 Nail Cakirhan Poetry Competition Poetry Award
 2010 Arkadaş Z. Ozger Poetry Competition
 2010 Eskisehir Film Festival Cinema Article about Eisenstein's "The Battleship Potemkin"

Filmography
 Mahpeyker (2010)
 Sarah (2010)
 Ezber (Short Film) - 2009
 The Power of Love (Short Film) - 2009
 Olu Yaprak Vurusu (2009)
 Bez Bebek (TV Serial) - 2008
 Ginger (Short Film) - 2006
 Bay Onemsizin Muhim Isleri (Short Film) (2005)
 Mountain (Short Film) - 2005
 What I can get away with (Short Film)'' - 2004

References

External links

 Alyosa 
 Interview with Hayati Citaklar
 
 Hayati Citaklar on Sinematurk 
 Theatre Square
 Kenter Theatre
 Kenter Theatre2
 Cinéma turc : Interview de Yeşim Ustaoğlu

Turkish poets
Turkish male film actors
1986 births
Bilkent University alumni
Turkish dramatists and playwrights
Living people
People from Tekirdağ